Revolutionary Socialist Party may refer to:

 Italian Revolutionary Socialist Party
 Kerala Revolutionary Socialist Party (Baby John) (India)
 National Revolutionary Socialist Party (India)
 Party of Socialist Revolution (Algeria)
 Party of Socialist Revolution (Lebanon)
 Polish Socialist Party - Revolution Faction
 Revolutionary Communist Party of Turkey-Socialist Unity
 Revolutionary Socialist Party (Australia)
 Revolutionary Socialist Party (France), 1890–1901
 Revolutionary Socialist Party (India)
 Revolutionary Socialist Party (Marxist), India
 Revolutionary Socialist Party (Netherlands)
 Revolutionary Socialist Party (Peru)
 Revolutionary Socialist Party (Marxist–Leninist), Peru
 Revolutionary Socialist Party (Portugal)
 Revolutionary Socialist Party (Sweden)
 Revolutionary Socialist Party (UK)
 Revolutionary Socialist Party (Zambia)
 Revolutionary Socialist Party of India (Marxist)
 Revolutionary Socialist Party of India (Marxist–Leninist)
 Revolutionary Socialist Party of Kerala (Bolshevik) (India)
 Revolutionary Socialist Party of Latvia
 Revolutionary Socialist Labor Party (United States)
 Revolutionary Socialist Workers' Party (France)
 Revolutionary Socialist Workers' Party (Turkey)
 Revolutionary Socialists (Egypt)
 Socialist Revolution Party of Benin
 Socialist Revolutionary Anarchist Party (Italy)
 Socialist Revolutionary Party (Russia)
 Somali Revolutionary Socialist Party
 Ukrainian Socialist-Revolutionary Party

See also
 Socialist Party (disambiguation)
 Socialist Revolutionary Party (disambiguation)